Valjevo Airport ( / Aerodrom Valjevo), also known as Divci Airport ( / Aerodrom Divci), is an airport in Divci near the City of Valjevo, Serbia and mountain resort Divčibare. The airport has one runway that is 1,250 metres long and 50 metres wide.

Future reconstruction
The idea of the construction of a cargo-transportation centre in Valjevo, 25 years ago, is again in the focus of interest. The backbone of all plans are Bar's railway, i.e. Valjevo-Loznica railway, future highway to the seaside and airport in Divci.

See also
 List of airports in Serbia
 Airports of Serbia
 Transport in Serbia
 AirSerbia

External links 
Valjevo airport information (PDF)
 Srbija će imati 16 malih aerodroma
 Krupne investicije

Airports in Serbia
Valjevo